Adir Maman (born 11 April 1991) is an Israeli professional association football player who played in the Liga Leumit.

Biography

Playing career 
Maman made his professional debut, coming on as a substitute for Douglas da Silva, in a 0–1 Toto Cup loss to Beitar Jerusalem on 23 September 2009.

International career 
Maman represented Israel at the 2009 Maccabiah Games, winning a bronze medal.

References

Footnotes 

1991 births
Living people
Competitors at the 2009 Maccabiah Games
Israeli footballers
Association football midfielders
Hapoel Tel Aviv F.C. players
Maccabi Ironi Bat Yam F.C. players
Sektzia Ness Ziona F.C. players
Maccabi Kiryat Malakhi F.C. players
CSF Bălți players
Footballers from Rehovot
Israeli expatriate footballers
Expatriate footballers in Moldova
Israeli expatriate sportspeople in Moldova
Maccabiah Games medalists in football
Maccabiah Games bronze medalists for Israel
Israeli people of Moroccan-Jewish descent
Place of birth missing (living people)